= Jerome's =

American discount furniture store chain

Jerome's Furniture Warehouse
- Founded: 1954; 72 years ago in San Diego, California, US
- Founder: Jim Navarra
- Number of locations: 25 locations, 1 corporate office, 1 distribution center, 7 clearance centers
- Area served: San Diego and Los Angeles, California
- Key people: Jerome "Jerry" Navarra, Chairman, Brian Woods President & CEO
- Products: Furniture and mattresses
- Services: Same day delivery, e-commerce
- Revenue: Approximately $250 million
- Owner: Family owned
- Number of employees: 611
- Website: www.jeromes.com

Jerome's Furniture Warehouse is a family-owned chain of discount furniture stores in Southern California, with its headquarters in San Diego, California. The company's key owner and figurehead is Jerome "Jerry" Navarra. By 2012 it was noted that Jerome's sold approximately one out of every four mattresses in San Diego County. By 2013 they were the second fastest growing furniture retailer in the United States.

== History ==
In 1954, Jim Navarra and his two partners started a furniture store named Strep's Warehouse. In 1960 Jim Navarra became the sole owner, and in 1968 he renamed the store Jerome's Furniture Warehouse after his son Jerome. Reluctant to sell furniture for a living, Jerome "Jerry" Navarra originally thought he might attend medical school. However, in 1970 after finishing a business degree at San Diego State University, he spent six months helping out at the store. Having enjoyed the experience, Jerry Navarra decided to stay, with the store eventually becoming his responsibility.

Between 1980 and 1990, four branches were added in the San Diego metropolitan area: San Marcos, Chula Vista, El Cajon, and Scripps Ranch. The original downtown store was moved in 2000 to West Morena Boulevard. Between 2009 and 2013 four more locations were added, which opened up the Los Angeles market. By 2013 Jerome's was selling roughly a quarter of all mattresses in San Diego County and was the second fastest growing furniture retailer in the United States.

By 2015 Jerome's had a total of 11 stores and a turnover of over $147 million, and had attained a top-fifty furniture retail ranking. Its strategies include selling its goods for a standard competitive price without periods of discounting, and offering free design services. In 2019 it began offering a free digital floor planner tool on its website.

Jerry Navarra has been both the namesake and the face of Jerome's Furniture since 1973 when he first appeared in a Jerome's TV ad. By 2012 he had appeared in more than 4,000 commercials, and now includes his family, the third generation of Navarras to join the family business. In 2008, Jerome's won the Western Home Furnishings Association's (WHFA) annual Retailer of the Year Award.
